Calling All Cars on the Vegas Strip is the debut studio album of the band Jucifer, originally released in 1998 through the independent label Crack Rock records and then in 2000 after have signed to Capricorn Records label. The album contains a mixture of metal, punk, hardcore, doom, sludge, alternative elements and scratch disk sound effects between track to track. This style wasn't explored by many bands in the late 1990s, was part of their sound during the 2000s, until the release of Throned in Blood in 2010.

Critical reception

Steve Huey for AllMusic said that the album overall "draws on the grungy noise of early alternative metal...and the loud, trashy sometimes industrial-tinged scuzz rock that preceded it." Craig Regala for Lollipop Magazine called the album an "interesting combination of sludgy and grungy riffs smut backed by real straight-up, small-kit drumming and a focus on rough-cut songs."

Track listing

Personnel 
Amber Valentine – guitar, Vocals, organ, vibraphone
Edgar Livengood – drums, horns, violin, vocals

References 

1998 debut albums
Jucifer albums